Mirabad (also Romanized as Mīrābād; also known as Mīrābād-e Khvājeh Ja‘far) is a village in Rivand Rural District, in the Central District of Nishapur County, Razavi Khorasan Province, Iran. At the 2006 census, its population was 67, in 21 families.

References 

Populated places in Nishapur County